Ana Fernández may refer to :

 Ana Fernández (actress, born 1963), Spanish actress, multiple Goya Award winner
 Ana Fernández (footballer) (born 2000), Spanish footballer
 Ana Fernández (volleyball) (born 1973), Cuban volleyball player
 Ana Fernández García (born 1989), Spanish actress
 Ana Teresa Fernández (born 1980), Mexican performance artist and painter

See also
Ana Rocha Fernandes, Cape Verdian film director, screenwriter and editor